Nikita Larionovič Larionov (Chuvash and ; 7 February 1932 – 22 September 2014) was a writer and poet. Larionov was a member of the Chuvashia Writers Union (1991), member of the Russia Writers Union, and was a USSR sports master. He lived in Alikovo, Alikovsky District, Chuvash Republic.

Biography 
Larionov was born 7 February 1932 in the village of Karmaly in the Alikovsky District (Chuvash Republic). He was educated in the Chuvash State Pedagogic University.

In 1953, he became the cross-country skiing champion of Chuvashia among students.

In 1969 he achieved the USSR master grade for sports walking.

After completing his education, Larionov worked in the Khirlepposi School and Alikovo middle school as Chuvash-language literature teacher and physical trainer, while creating his first novel.

He lived and worked in the village Alikovo, has been an active community leader. Although he experienced all the hardships of the war years, he wrote poetry, short stories, novels, full of optimism and love of life, and faith in the perfect. Nikita Larionovich worked equally well in prose and in poetry.

Being a true devotee of a healthy lifestyle, Nikita Larionov always participated in international sporting events among veterans, won prizes. In 1990, in Budapest at European Race Walking Championships in the age group 55–59 years at distances 5 km and 20 km took 3rd place.

On 22 September 2014 he died of heart failure. He was buried in a country churchyard, near the grave of his wife.

Literary creativity 
Lariomov grew up during World War II, but his verses and novels are very optimistic. His works were published in the magazines Тӑван Атӑл (Own Atăl) and Ялав (Banner), and the newspaper Пурнӑҫ ҫулӗпе (On Life's Way).

He has written 16 books, among them:

 Йӗпкӗн хӗрлӗ хӑю, ("Red Ribbon"), Cheboksary.
 Олимпийский балл, ("Olimpic Strip"), novel, Moscow, 1986.
 Хӗр тупри (Girl's wealth), Alikovo-Cheboksary, 2001.
 Ват ӑшши (Indian Summer), Cheboksary, 2010.
 Асамлӑ маҫ (Magical solution), Cheboksary, 2012.

Literature 
 Аликовская энциклопедия, редколлегия: Ефимов Л.А., Ефимов Е.Л., Ананьев А. А., Терентьев Г. К., Cheboksary, 2009, .

References

External links 
 Alikovsky District news
 Anniversary of our colleague - a veteran writer

1932 births
2014 deaths
Chuvash writers
People from Alikovsky District
Chuvash-language poets
20th-century poets